Gerd Sheytan (also Romanized as Gerd Sheyţān; also known as Gīr Sheyţān, Shaitan, and Sheyţān) is a village in Mangur-e Gharbi Rural District, in the Central District of Piranshahr County, West Azerbaijan Province, Iran. At the 2006 census, its population was 181, in 29 families.

References 

Populated places in Piranshahr County